USS Olympic (SP-260) was a United States Navy patrol vessel in commission from 1917 to 1919.

Olympic was built as a civilian yacht of the same name in 1913 by E. W. Heath at Seattle, Washington. The U.S. Navy acquired her from her owner, Frank Wright of Seattle, on 15 May 1917 for World War I service as a patrol vessel. She was commissioned on 9 June 1917 as USS Olympic (SP-260).

Operating on section patrol duties in the 13th Naval District (headquartered at Fort Townsend, Washington) during World War I, Olympic patrolled in and around Puget Sound.

Olympic was transferred to the United States Coast and Geodetic Survey on 13 September 1919. Renamed USC&GS Dailhache on 12 November 1919, she served at Seattle with the Survey until sold to H. W. McCurdy on 10 February 1934.

References

NavSource Online: Section Patrol Craft Photo Archive: USC&GS Dailhache ex-USS Olympic (SP 260)

Patrol vessels of the United States Navy
World War I patrol vessels of the United States
Individual yachts
Ships built in Seattle
1913 ships
Ships transferred from the United States Navy to the United States Coast and Geodetic Survey